Martín Ezequiel Uranga (born February 5, 1980 in Rosario, Argentina) is a former Argentine footballer currently playing for clubs of Argentina, Chile and El Salvador.

Teams
  Argentino de Rosario 1998-1999
  Newell's Old Boys 2000-2001
  Central Córdoba de Rosario 2001-2002
  Palestino 2002-2003
  Arcense 2003
  Isidro Metapán 2004
  Atlético Tucumán 2004-2005
  Platense 2005-2006
  C.A.I. 2006
  Guillermo Brown 2007-2008
  Juventud Unida Universitario 2008
  Estudiantes de Río Cuarto 2009
  Racing de Olavarría 2010
  Atlético Juventud Alianza 2010

References
 Profile at BDFA 

1980 births
Living people
Argentine footballers
Argentine expatriate footballers
Newell's Old Boys footballers
Atlético Tucumán footballers
Comisión de Actividades Infantiles footballers
Guillermo Brown footballers
Club Atlético Platense footballers
Club Deportivo Palestino footballers
Chilean Primera División players
Argentine Primera División players
Expatriate footballers in Chile
Expatriate footballers in El Salvador
Argentino de Rosario footballers
Estudiantes de Río Cuarto footballers

Association footballers not categorized by position
Footballers from Rosario, Santa Fe